Flatrock Township is one of the thirteen townships of Henry County, Ohio, United States. As of the 2010 census the population was 1,247, of whom 962 lived in the unincorporated portion of the township.

Geography
Located in the western part of the county, it borders the following townships:
Napoleon Township - north
Harrison Township - northeast corner
Monroe Township - east
Marion Township - southeast corner
Pleasant Township - south
Highland Township, Defiance County - southwest corner
Richland Township, Defiance County - west
Adams Township, Defiance County - northwest corner

The village of Florida is located in northwestern Flatrock Township, and a portion of the village of Holgate is in the southeastern part of the township.

Name and history
It is the only Flatrock Township statewide.

Government
The township is governed by a three-member board of trustees, who are elected in November of odd-numbered years to a four-year term beginning on the following January 1. Two are elected in the year after the presidential election and one is elected in the year before it. There is also an elected township fiscal officer, who serves a four-year term beginning on April 1 of the year after the election, which is held in November of the year before the presidential election. Vacancies in the fiscal officership or on the board of trustees are filled by the remaining trustees.

Trustees:
 Thomas J. Bortz (Term Ends 2017)
 Nicholas P. Franz (Term Ends 2017)
 Charles M. Eberle (Term Ends 2019)
Fiscal Officer: Anne M. Taylor (Term Ends 2019)

Zoning Inspector:  Lauren Bunke

References

External links
County website

Townships in Henry County, Ohio
Townships in Ohio